Martha Dolores Guzmán Partida is a Mexican mathematician specializing in functional analysis, including Fourier analysis, harmonic analysis, and the theory of distributions. She is a professor of mathematics at the Universidad de Sonora.

Education
Guzmán Partida was an undergraduate at the Meritorious Autonomous University of Puebla. She completed her doctorate in 1995 at the National Autonomous University of Mexico. Her dissertation, Hardy Spaces of Conjugates Temperatures, was supervised by Salvador Pérez Esteva.

Recognition
Guzmán was elected to the Mexican Academy of Sciences in 2013.

References

External links

Year of birth missing (living people)
Living people
Mexican mathematicians
Mexican women mathematicians
Functional analysts
Meritorious Autonomous University of Puebla alumni
National Autonomous University of Mexico alumni
Academic staff of Universidad de Sonora
Members of the Mexican Academy of Sciences